Les Hawken (born 9 June 1949) is a former Australian rules footballer who played with Hawthorn in the VFL during the early 1970s.

Hawken was a back pocket specialist and debuted for Hawthorn in 1970. He was a member of their 1971 premiership team. After leaving the Hawks following the 1974 season he finished his career in Tasmania with the Cooee Football Club.

External links

1949 births
Living people
Australian rules footballers from Victoria (Australia)
Hawthorn Football Club players
Hawthorn Football Club Premiership players
Cooee Football Club players
One-time VFL/AFL Premiership players